Sisterly Love is a 1987 Australian television film shot in Western Australia. Nominated for 3 AFI (Australian Film Institute) Awards in 1988 including Best Telefeature. It was also the pilot for an unmade series.

Premise
Two sisters, Jean and Sylvia, have been separated over twenty years. Sylvia lives next door to Bob. When Jean is widowed, she visits Sylvia and old troubles re-emerge. Sylvia has a son Martin who is dating Birdy.

Cast
Joan Sydney as Jean
Maggie King as Sylvia
Martin Vaughan as Bob
Matthew Parkinson as Martin
Sandra Eldridge as Birdy

Production
Stars Joan Sydney and Maggie King are sisters in real life. Filming was to have begun in September 1987 but was held up to due a union ban over the use of a British first assistant director.

It was filmed in Fremantle, Rottnest Island, and Kings Park.

Reception
The Sydney Morning Herald gave it a poor review. The Age called it "perfectly charming".

References

External links

Australian television films
1987 films
1987 television films
Films about sisters
1980s English-language films